Minnesota State Highway 37 (MN 37) is a  highway in northeast Minnesota, which runs from its intersection with U.S. 169 / State Highway 73 in Hibbing and continues east to its eastern terminus at its intersection with State Highway 135 in Gilbert.

Highway 37 serves as a direct route between Hibbing and U.S. Highway 53.

Route description
State Highway 37 serves as an east–west route between Hibbing, Eveleth, and Gilbert in northeast Minnesota.

The Wellstone Memorial and Historic site is located three miles east of the junction of U.S. 53 / Highway 37 / Bodas Road at Fayal Township near Eveleth.  The site honors Senator Paul Wellstone and seven others who died in an October 25, 2002 plane crash.

History
State Highway 37, between U.S. 53 at Eveleth and State Highway 135 at Gilbert, was authorized in 1933.

The route was paved by 1940.

The section of Highway 37 between U.S. 53 at Fayal Township near Eveleth and U.S. 169 at Hibbing was authorized in 1949.  This portion of Highway 37 was originally numbered State Highway 216 from 1949 to 1963.

Major intersections

References

037
Transportation in St. Louis County, Minnesota